Big Brother 2 is the second season of the Polish reality television series Big Brother. The show followed a number of contestants, known as housemates, who are isolated from the outside world for an extended period of time in a custom-built house. Each week, one of the housemates is evicted by a public vote, with the last housemate remaining winning a cash prize.

The show was started on August 26, 2001 with Big Brother: Ty Wybierasz  (lit. Big Brother: You Choose). And concluded on December 16, 2001, last 113 days.

Andrzej Sołtysik and Martyna Wojciechowska host the main show. Marzena Wieczorek walked out as the winner. The prize for him is 500.000 PLN.

Big Brother: Ty Wybierasz
On Sunday, 26 August, 6 candidates (Barbara Knap, Jakub Jankowski, Alicja Dęręgowska, Ireneusz Górski, Krzysztof Czekalski, Małgorzata Witczak) entered the house for a week to take part the special show - Big Brother: Ty Wybierasz (lit. Big Brother: You Choose). At the end of the week (1 September 2001), the viewers chose two people (Barbara Knap and Jakub Jankowski) to continue to live in the Big Brother house.

Housemates

Nominations Table

Notes

References

External links 
 Official site

02